Roger Cousins, OBE, served as acting Governor of Anguilla from January 27, 2000 to February 4, 2000, between the tenures of Robert Harris and Peter Johnstone. He has also served as Her Majesty's Treasury Overseas Allowances Inspector, as well as the Chief Secretary to the Turks and Caicos Islands and Deputy Governor of Anguilla.

References

Living people
Governors of Anguilla
Year of birth missing (living people)